Aperfield is a hamlet and area in London, England, within the London Borough of Bromley,  south-southeast of Charing Cross.

It is near Biggin Hill and Berry's Green. The name has its first recorded use in 1242 as Apeldrefeld and means field where apple trees grow, from the Old English words apuldor and feld.

References

Nearest places
Biggin Hill
Cudham

Areas of London
Districts of the London Borough of Bromley
Hamlets in the London Borough of Bromley